The Newfoundland Ranger Force was the police force of the Dominion of Newfoundland. It provided law enforcement and other government services to outports for 15 years.  It existed from 1935 to 1949, at which point it was merged into the Royal Canadian Mounted Police (RCMP). 204 men served as Rangers during its existence, though at any given time the force did not exceed 72 members.

The Commission of Government decided to model the Newfoundland Ranger force on the RCMP and not the Royal Newfoundland Constabulary, which at the time were in operation at St. John's.

Operations

Training, which included paramilitary marching, battle drill and small arms practice, was administered by a sergeant major of the Newfoundland Militia.

The uniform, similar to that of the RCMP, consisted of a khaki tunic and breeches with a brown stripe, fur caps as winter attire. The dress uniform was of blue serge and accompanied by swords and sometimes hickory batons for riot control.

The badge was of a caribou head inscribed with the motto , meaning everywhere.

Headquarters were located in the basement of the Colonial Building in St. John's and the forces men were housed in temporary barracks in a tent in Whitbourne, which later became permanent HQ from 1936 to 1942 In 1942 HQ moved to Kilbride and remained until the force was disbanded in 1950.

Duties
They were responsible for carrying out policies of six government departments;
 Department of Finance, collection of customs duties and other fees and act as wreck commissioners.
 Department of Natural Resources, inspection of logging camps, enforcement of game laws, issuing game licences and directing the fighting of forest fires.
 Department of Public Health and Welfare, issuing relief payments, arranging medical treatment and hospitalization and escorting mental patients to hospital in St. John's.
 Department of Justice, enforcement of criminal law, investigation of suspicious deaths and in some areas acted as deputy sheriffs.
 Department of Home Affairs and Education, acted as truant officers and organized adult education programs.
 Department of Public Utilities, supervising the maintenance and construction of public roads, wharves and breakwaters.

Ranks

 Ranger - 3 Classes
 Corporal
 Sergeant
 Staff Sergeant
 Inspector
 Lieutenant
 Chief Ranger

Civilian staff were non-sworn members:

 Maintenance staff
 Cooks
 Stenographers
 Filing Clerk

History

The force was recommended by Deputy Minister of Justice Brian Dunfield in 1932 to the Amulree Commission. The Newfoundland Constabulary was to remain as the police force for the major centres on the Avalon and Bonavista peninsulas while the Rangers would service remote areas of the island and Labrador.

The force was placed under the Department of Natural Resources, though served all six of the Commission's departments, under the control of Major Leonard T. Stick, an officer of the Royal Newfoundland Regiment.

The former estate of Sir Robert Bond, the Grange, located at Whitbourne was used as training facilities. Amongst the training in law enforcement they were also trained in how to record vital statistics and submit monthly reports.

When World War II began in 1939, the Dominions Office was forced to declare the Rangers an essential service, thus disallowing members to enlist in other armed services, after thirty-four Rangers had left the service.  Those members who had departed joined a variety of military forces, including the Newfoundland Heavy Artillery, the Royal Air Force, the Royal Canadian Air Force, the Royal Canadian Navy and the Royal Navy.

The force was called upon to attend political meetings and also act as observers and during the 1948 referendum they operated the polling stations.

On April 1, 1949, the Newfoundland Rangers were amalgamated with the RCMP.

In popular culture
A lasting tribute to the Rangers is a poem that appeared in the Ranger Bulletin (No.6, 1943) entitled "Courtesy is the Best Policy", it reads in part: To be a real policeman Be big and strong by heck But let the strength be always found Just above the neck.

Harold Horwood's novel White Eskimo is based upon Frank Mercer, a Ranger who in 1936 travelled across the Kiglapait Mountains in the middle of the winter to investigate a homicide and retrieve the body back to headquarters, a feat that was celebrated in the media of the time.

Dean Bragg made a similar feat when he travelled over 140 miles to the interior of Labrador and back to investigate a plane crash.

Earl Prilgrim's novel Will Anyone Search for Danny? gives an account of Dan Corcoran who had left his detachment at Harbour Deep to go to Port Saunders and became lost and was found many days later.

The 2006 Mary Walsh film Young Triffie involves a Newfoundland Ranger (played by Fred Ewanuick) sent to the remote outport of Swyer's Harbour to investigate sheep mutilation, but eventually involved in a vicious murder.

The television series Republic of Doyle references the Newfoundland Ranger Force in the episode "Retribution". When Tinny graduates from the police academy and becomes a constable, her uncle Jake gives her a medal inscribed "1936". He explains that his grandfather (Tinny's great-grandfather) received it when he joined the Newfoundland Rangers, and passed it down to Jake's father (Tinny's grandfather) Malachy when Malachy became a constable. Malachy in turn passed the medal on to Jake when Jake graduated from the police academy.

Chief Rangers

Chief Rangers who had served with the force;

 Leonard Stick (1892-1979) 1935-1936: Major Leonard Stick was the first person to join the Newfoundland Regiment in World War I
 Frederick A. Anderton 1936 - 1939: English-born police officer came to Canada to join the then RNWMP, served with the Canadian Expeditionary Force and retired as RCMP Sergeant-Major; most of his career was served in Alberta, Northwest Territories and Yukon Anderton headed training for the NRF beginning in 1935 before heading the force
 E.W. Greenley 1939: RCMP Sergeant Major was temporary replacement for a few months and later retired with the RCMP
 Raymond Danson Fraser (1898-1961) 1939 - 1944: retired Lieutenant with the Royal Newfoundland Regiment and joined NRF as Inspector and later worked overseas for the Government of Canada
 Edward LeDrew Martin (1910-2006) 1944 - 1950: Career NRF member and later joined the RCMP as Assistant Commissioner

Other Notable Rangers
 Rangers Daniel Corcoran (#14), Michael Greene (#49), and Michael Collins (#166) are notable for being the only rangers to die while on duty.

References

 The Newfoundland Rangers, Darrin McGrath, et al.

External links 
 Website dedicated to the Newfoundland Rangers
 Officer Down Memorial for Newfoundland Rangers

Law enforcement agencies of Newfoundland and Labrador
Defunct law enforcement agencies of Canada
1935 establishments in Newfoundland
1949 disestablishments in Newfoundland